Middlefork Methodist Episcopal Church is a historic church on the South of US 169 on the east side of Middle Fork, Grand Road in Redding, Iowa, United States.  It is now known as Middlefork United Methodist Church.

History
Methodist classes were organized at the Center (renamed Rose Hill) and Clipper schoolhouses in the early 1870s. The impetus to establish Middlefork Church was a six-week revival held under the leadership of the Rev. T.G. Aten and conducted by the Rev. Bill McFarland in the Spring of 1886. The schoolhouses were no longer large enough to hold the number of people who attended services. Property adjacent to the centrally located Middle Fork Cemetery was chosen for the new congregation to build a church, and all the funds necessary to build the church were in hand when construction began. Stone for the foundation was quarried on the Riley Motsinger farm a few miles north of Allendale, Missouri. The bricks and lumber came from Bedford, Iowa. Local carpenters W. M. Staton and J. A. Saville oversaw the construction. Construction was begun and completed in 1886. The church building was added to the National Register of Historic Places in 1990.

Architecture
Middlefork United Methodist Church is a rectangular-plan structure that measures . The exterior is covered with white clapboard siding, and it rests on a limestone foundation. Overall the building is plain. Italianate features include the tall, narrow, round hooded windows along the sides, the double-door entryway on the front, the corner boards with capitals, frieze board trim, round hood molds above the windows and the main entrance, and moldings at the eaves.

References

Religious organizations established in 1886
Churches completed in 1886
United Methodist churches in Iowa
Churches on the National Register of Historic Places in Iowa
National Register of Historic Places in Ringgold County, Iowa
Italianate architecture in Iowa
Buildings and structures in Ringgold County, Iowa
Italianate church buildings in the United States